String music from Appenzell plays an important role in the instrumental practice of the region. The first songs from Appenzell originated in the 13th century, by Heinrich von Sax, Lord of castle Clanx, around 1270. In the 16th century an Appenzeller Kuereien Lobelobe, a type of yodel, was composed. Until the end of the 17th century, common instruments such as the drums, pipes, bagpipes, and shalms were also prevalent in this region.

The Alder Streichmusik ensemble from Urnäsch was first established in the Appenzeller Hinterland in 1884. The year 1892 saw the foundation of the so-called "Original Sting Music from Appenzell" Streich-Quintett Appenzell, a quintet from Appenzell featuring two violins, a dulcimer, a cello and a double bass. Around 1900 the Streichmusik Schmid of Walzenhausen joined them. In 1913 Streichmusik Edelweiss of Trogen was established by Hans Rechsteiner.

Representatives of this music are or were: Streichmusik Alder, Streichmusik Schmid, Streichmusik Edelweiss Herisau, Streichmusik Hornsepp, Streichmusik Weissbad, Streichmusik Alperösli, Geschwister Küng, Frauestriichmusig, Streichmusik Bänziger, Toggenburger Original Striichmusig, Brandhölzer Striichmusig, Streichmusik Kalöi, Appenzeller Echo and many more ...

The repertoire of Appenzell instrumental music and yodelling is documented and updated by the Center for Folk Music from Appenzell in the Roothuus Gonten.

External links
 Center for Folk Music from Appenzell 

Appenzell Innerrhoden